Gilles Vigneault  (born 27 October 1928) is a Canadian poet, publisher, singer-songwriter, and Quebec nationalist and sovereigntist. Two of his songs are considered by many to be Quebec's unofficial anthems: "Mon pays" and "Gens du pays", and his line Mon pays ce n'est pas un pays, c'est l'hiver (My country is not a country, it is winter, from "Mon Pays") became a proverb in Quebec. Vigneault is a Grand Officer of the National Order of Quebec, Knight of the Legion of Honour, and Officer of the Ordre des Arts et des Lettres.

Life and career
Vigneault was born in Natashquan, in the Côte-Nord region of Quebec.

He started writing poetry during his studies at the seminary in Rimouski, and by the 1950s was publishing poems and writing songs for other performers. In 1959, he founded the publishing house Les Éditions de l'Arc to distribute his publications. His first collection, Étraves, was published in 1959.

In 1960, Vigneault made his singing debut at the L'Arlequin club in Quebec City, followed by a successful Montreal concert later that year. In 1962, he recorded his first album, Gilles Vigneault, and received the Grand Prix du Disque from Montreal radio station CKAC. His reputation grew in Quebec and beyond with the success of his song "Mon Pays", from the soundtrack of the NFB film The Snow Has Melted on the Manicouagan (La neige a fondu sur la Manicouagan) in 1965.

Vigneault's reputation as a songwriter and performer continued to spread and he became popular not only in Quebec, but also in English Canada and Europe. He performed in major Canadian concert halls, including Montreal's Place des Arts, the National Arts Centre in Ottawa, and at Toronto's Massey Hall. In Europe, he toured in France, Switzerland, Poland, Belgium, and Luxembourg.

The mid-1970s saw Vigneault's participation in several major events. On 13 August 1974, 130,000 spectators came together on the Plains of Abraham for the Superfrancofête, where Vigneault participated in a historic concert alongside Félix Leclerc and Robert Charlebois. The concert was recorded and released as the album . At the Saint-Jean-Baptiste Day concert "Les 5 Jean-Baptistes" on Montreal's Mount Royal on 24 June 1976, Gilles Vigneault performed together with Robert Charlebois, Jean-Pierre Ferland, and Yvon Deschamps. This concert was recorded and released as 1 fois 5, which later received the Grand Prix du Disque (the Charles Cros award).

Vigneault's political views have remained strongly in favour of national sovereignty for Quebec. During the 2014 Quebec general election campaign, he supported the Parti Québécois.

The main subjects of Vigneault's writing are Quebec and its people, as well as human relationships, love, and everyday life. Vigneault is also concerned with environmental issues and has written songs and tales for children.

His childhood reminiscences about his upbringing were filmed by Michel Moreau for the 1993 documentary film A Childhood in Natashquan (Une enfance à Natashquan).

Family
Gilles Vigneault has seven children: Michel, Louis, François (a poet and lyricist), Pascale, Guillaume (a novelist), Jessica (a pianist and singer), and Benjamin (a percussionist).

Discography (partial)

Honours
Honorary doctorates:
 Trent University (1975)
 Université du Québec à Rimouski (1979)
 Université de Montréal (1981)
 York University (1985)
 Carleton University (2017)

Awards and honours:
 Prix Félix-Leclerc for the song "Mon pays" (1965)
 Governor General's Award for French language poetry or drama (1965)
 Prix de musique Calixa-Lavallée (1966)
 Grand Prix du Disque of the Charles Cros Academy, Paris (in 1970 for Du milieu du pont, in 1984 for two recordings for children: Les Quatre saisons de Piquot and Quelques pas dans l'univers d'Éviola and in 1990)
 Molson Prize (1982)
 Prix Denise-Pelletier conferred by the Quebec government (1983)
 Médaille Jacques-Blanchet (1987)
 Grande médaille de la chanson française-Vermeil medal (1988)
 Governor General's Performing Arts Award - Lifetime Artistic Achievement (1993)
 Canadian Songwriters Hall of Fame (2006)

He is a Grand Officer of the National Order of Quebec (2000), Knight of the Légion d'honneur (1986), and Officier of the Ordre des Arts et des Lettres (1990).

Several cultural institutions and streets in Quebec and France bear the name of Gilles Vigneault:
 The library of the Rimouski Community college (La Bibliothèque Gilles-Vigneault)
 École Gilles-Vigneault (Montreal, Quebec)
 École Gilles-Vigneault de Marseille (Marseille, France)
 Rue Gilles-Vigneault (Blainville, Quebec)
 Rue Gilles-Vigneault (Rimouski, Quebec)
 Rue Gilles-Vigneault (Granby, Quebec)
 Rue Gilles Vigneault (Saint-Charles-Borromée, Québec)

See also

 List of Quebec musicians
 List of poets
 Music of Quebec
 Culture of Quebec

References

Further reading

External links
 
 Gilles Vigneault chante son pays – Archives de Radio-Canada (French) 
  Pendant que Gilles Vigneault at Radio-Canada
  Gilles Vigneault at Québec Info Musique

1928 births
20th-century Canadian poets
Canadian male poets
Living people
Grand Officers of the National Order of Quebec
Chevaliers of the Légion d'honneur
Officiers of the Ordre des Arts et des Lettres
Songwriters from Quebec
French Quebecers
French-language singers of Canada
Canadian expatriates in France
Singers from Quebec
Prix Denise-Pelletier winners
Columbia Records artists
Canadian poets in French
Writers from Quebec
Governor General's Performing Arts Award winners
20th-century Canadian male writers
Université Laval alumni
Quebec sovereigntists